Cresson is a South American genus of kleptoparasitic wasps in the family Crabronidae.

Species
Cresson mariastea Packer, 2021
Cresson parvispinosus (Reed, 1894)
Cresson salitrera Packer, 2021

References

Crabronidae